Piccarda Bueri (1368–1433) was an Italian noblewoman of the Renaissance.

Life
She was the daughter of Edoardo Bueri, a member of a family of ancient lineage from Florence with economic interests in other cities; the family was in fact in Verona in the first half of the fourteenth century when she was born.  She was married to the young banker Giovanni di Bicci de' Medici in 1386. She brought a dowry of 1500 florins to the marriage.

She was known for her beauty, but her husband was known for being ugly. The marriage brought respectability to Giovanni and their children, since he was not of noble descent. Just before he died, he asked her to take care of their children. She was buried with him after her death in the Old Sacristy of San Lorenzo.

Upon her death, Carlo Marsuppini wrote a eulogy in which he sang her praises, in which he compared the love between Piccarda and Giovanni with that of famous couples from antiquity. In it, he compared her with Penelope, Artemisia II of Caria, Julia and Porcia.

Issue
By her marriage, she had four sons:
Cosimo di Giovanni de' Medici (1389–1464)
Damiano di Giovanni de'Medici (d.1390). Most probraly Cosimo's twin, died in infancy. 
Lorenzo di Giovanni de' Medici (1395–1440)
Antonio di Giovanni de' Medici (b. circa 1398). Died young

Fictional Depictions
Bueri is portrayed by Frances Barber in the 2016 television series Medici: Masters of Florence.

References

Sources 
 

1368 births
1433 deaths
14th-century people of the Republic of Florence
15th-century people of the Republic of Florence
14th-century Italian women
15th-century Italian women
House of Medici
Nobility from Florence
Patrons of literature